The National Emblem of the Udmurt Autonomous Soviet Socialist Republic was adopted in 1937 by the government of the Udmurt Autonomous Soviet Socialist Republic. The emblem is identical to the Emblem of the Russian Soviet Federative Socialist Republic.

History 
On March 14, 1937, the Extraordinary 2nd Congress of Soviets of the Udmurt Autonomous Soviet Socialist Republic adopted the Constitution of the Udmurt Autonomous Soviet Socialist Republic. The Article 109 of the Constitution contained the description of the state emblem:

The design of the actual emblem doesn't match with the constitution. Instead of a full inscription of the name of the ASSR, the abbreviation of the ASSR was abbreviated. The motto in the Udmurt language was depicted on the ribbon on the right, and in Russian on the left.

First revision 
On May 31, 1978, the extraordinary IX session of the Supreme Soviet of the UASSR of the ninth adopted the new Constitution of the Udmurt Autonomous Soviet Socialist Republic. The article 157 of the constitution contained the description of the state emblem:

In accordance with this description of the Udmurt Autonomous Soviet Socialist Republic, the "Statute on the State Emblem of the Udmurt Autonomous Soviet Socialist Republic" was approved. The name of the ASSR in Russian and Udmurt was depicted on the coat of arms in full words, rather than abbreviation. The motto in the Udmurt language was located on the red ribbon under the motto in Russian. The coat of arms, like the coat of arms of the RSFSR and other ASSRs, was crowned with a red five-pointed star in a thin white border with a brown outline. 

The motto in the Udmurt language : ВАНЬ СТРАНАОСЫСЬ ПРОЛЕТАРИЙЁС, ОГАЗЕЯСЬКЕ!

Gallery 

Udmurt Autonomous Soviet Socialist Republic
Udmurt ASSR
Udmurt ASSR
Udmurt ASSR
Udmurt ASSR
Udmurt ASSR